Robbert Klomp (born 14 May 1955) is a former Australian rules footballer who played with Sturt in the South Australian National Football League (SANFL), and with Carlton and Footscray in the Victorian Football League (VFL).

Klomp was born in the Netherlands and raised in South Australia. He began playing for Sturt in 1973 and was a key contributor to their premierships in 1974 and 1976. 

He was one of the best players on the ground in the 1976 SANFL Grand Final, kicking 2 goals from centre half forward and creating several more for his teammates with clever handpasses. 

Klomp was signed by VFL club, Carlton during the summer of 1978/79 and made an immediate impact in his first season with the  Blues on the half back flank. He played every game of Carlton's 1979 premiership season, finishing equal 7th in the Brownlow Medal with 13 votes and accumulating 20 possessions in both finals while minding dangerous opponents, Russell Ebert and Rene Kink.

He suffered a severe hamstring injury midway through the 1981 season and had to watch Carlton's victorious Grand Final from the sidelines. But he returned the following year to play all but one game of Carlton's 1982 premiership season and was an integral member of the league's stingiest defence.

A recurrence of hamstring injuries curtailed Klomp's VFL career. After 84 games at Carlton, he transferred to Footscray in June 1983 where he managed to play just 9 games in his two seasons there. 

He returned to Adelaide in 1985 where he played another three years with Sturt and retired at the end of the 1987 season after 205 games in the SANFL. 

During his career, he also played seven State of Origin games for South Australia. 

Klomp's brother Kim played for SANFL clubs Sturt and North Adelaide.

Statistics
 

|- style="background-color: #EAEAEA"
| scope=row bgcolor=F0E68C | 1979# || 
| 22 || 24 || 2 || 3 || 227 || 208 || 435 || 85 || – || 0.1 || 0.1 || 9.5 || 8.7 || 18.1 || 3.5 || – || 13
|-
! scope="row" style="text-align:center" | 1980
|
| 22 || 23 || 8 || 5 || 202 || 191 || 393 || 91 || – || 0.3 || 0.2 || 8.8 || 8.3 || 17.1 || 4.0 || – || 3
|- style="background-color: #EAEAEA"
! scope="row" style="text-align:center" | 1981
|
| 22 || 10 || 1 || 2 || 99 || 57 || 156 || 30 || – || 0.1 || 0.2 || 9.9 || 5.7 || 15.6 || 3.0 || – || 1
|-
| scope=row bgcolor=F0E68C | 1982# || 
| 22 || 24 || 6 || 5 || 179 || 130 || 309 || 67 || – || 0.3 || 0.2 || 7.5 || 5.4 || 12.9 || 2.8 || – || 0
|- style="background-color: #EAEAEA"
! scope="row" style="text-align:center" | 1983
|
| 22 || 3 || 0 || 1 || 12 || 11 || 23 || 5 || – || 0.0 || 0.3 || 4.0 || 3.7 || 7.7 || 1.7 || – || 0
|-
! scope="row" style="text-align:center" | 1983
|
| 21 || 8 || 3 || 0 || 47 || 58 || 105 || 23 || – || 0.4 || 0.0 || 5.9 || 7.3 || 13.1 || 2.9 || – || 0
|- style="background-color: #EAEAEA"
! scope="row" style="text-align:center" | 1984
|
| 21 || 1 || 0 || 0 || 8 || 4 || 12 || 4 || – || 0.0 || 0.0 || 8.0 || 4.0 || 12.0 || 4.0 || – || 0
|- class="sortbottom"
! colspan=3| Career
! 93
! 20
! 16
! 774
! 659
! 1433
! 305
! –	
! 0.2
! 0.2
! 8.3
! 7.1
! 15.4
! 3.3
! –
! 17
|}

Notes

References

External links
Blueseum profile

1955 births
Living people
VFL/AFL players born outside Australia
South Australian State of Origin players
Western Bulldogs players
Carlton Football Club players
Carlton Football Club Premiership players
Sturt Football Club players
All-Australians (1953–1988)
Dutch emigrants to Australia
Australian rules footballers from South Australia
Two-time VFL/AFL Premiership players